Bahrabad (also Romanized as Bahrābād; also known as Bahrāmābād) is a village in Nazil Rural District, Nukabad District, Khash County, Sistan and Baluchestan Province, Iran. At the 2006 census, its population was 314, in 90 families.

References 

Populated places in Khash County